John McDermond VC (1832 – 22 July 1868) was a Scottish recipient of the Victoria Cross, the highest and most prestigious award for gallantry in the face of the enemy that can be awarded to British and Commonwealth forces.

Details
McDermond was approximately 22 years old, and a private in the 47th (the Lancashire) Regiment of Foot, British Army during the Crimean War when the following deed took place for which he was awarded the VC.

On 5 November 1854 at the Battle of Inkerman, Crimea, Private McDermond and Captain Hugh Rowlands saved the life of a Colonel William O'Grady Haly who was lying wounded on the ground surrounded by the enemy. Private McDermond rushed to the rescue and killed the man who had wounded the colonel. 

There is a painting depicting this event hung in the Queen's Lancashire Regiment Museum at Fulwood Barracks, Preston.
According to his service record John McDermod was from Clackmannan and was discharged due to injury. He died 19 July 1866 Glasgow, Scotland of typhus. Although only 38 his profession was marked down as "pensioner".

It is generally believed that he is buried in Paisley but this may be because a person with the same name died at the poor house there in 1868

The medal

Of the 16 V.C.'s awarded for actions during the Battle of Inkerman, two are unaccounted for – those won by John McDermond and John Byrne of the 68th Durham Light Infantry, the other 14 being in private collections or museums.

It is thought a Victoria Cross medal (missing the suspender bar and ribbon) found by Tobias Neto in the mud of the river Thames in December 2015 could be that of John McDermond or John Byrne  - the medal having the date of 5 November 1854 engraved on the reverse.

References

Monuments to Courage (David Harvey, 1999)
The Register of the Victoria Cross (This England, 1997)
Scotland's Forgotten Valour (Graham Ross, 1995)

External links
Location of grave and VC medal (Glasgow)currently flagged up by virus checker

1832 births
1868 deaths
Military personnel from Glasgow
Loyal Regiment soldiers
Deaths from typhus
British recipients of the Victoria Cross
Crimean War recipients of the Victoria Cross
British Army personnel of the Crimean War
British Army recipients of the Victoria Cross
Infectious disease deaths in Scotland